The RN01-SS anti-ship and land attack missile currently being developed by the Indonesian Ministry of Defense and several companies. RN01-SS stands for Rudal Nasional 01 - Surface to Surface. The RN01-SS has a subsonic speed and its appearance is similar to the C-705 missile.

Development 
The development was carried out by the Ministry of Defense and BPPT together with a consortium of companies consisting of PT Dirgantara Indonesia, PT Pindad, PT Dahana, PT LEN Industri and PT Teknologi Rekatama Solusi Indonesia (TRESS). 

In the 2020 LAPAN activity report, it is known that an RN01-SS model was tested in the Lapan Pustekbang subsonic wind tunnel. In these testing activities, the aerodynamics laboratory of the LAPAN aviation technology center provides wind tunnel facilities. Meanwhile, the data acquisition system and sensors used belong to PT Dirgantara Indonesia. 

The test model used is a test model with a scale of 1:1. The configuration of the model consists of a shortened body, inlet nacelle, inlet duct and turbojet engine (F1ID). Engine-inlet static testing using a special test-rig with a model scale of 1:1.

See also 

 C-705
 Naval Strike Missile

References

Sources 

 Prabowo, Gunawan Setyo (2021). Laporan Akuntabilitas Kinerja Pustekbang LAPAN 2020. Pusat Teknologi Penerbangan Lembaga Penerbangan dan Antariksa Nasional.

Anti-ship missiles
Surface-to-surface missiles
Military equipment of Indonesia